Sergio Galdós (born January 2, 1990) is a Peruvian tennis player. He is a regular member of the Peruvian Davis Cup team. In 2016 he broke into the top 100 of the men's doubles rankings for the first time finishing the year ranked No. 80 in the world on 28 November 2016.

Personal Info

Galdós is sponsored by Joma.

ATP career finals

Doubles

Challenger and Futures finals

Singles: 2 (0–2)

Doubles: 67 (30–37)

ATP ranking evolution

Singles
Changes in the ranking ATP to the end of the season.

Doubles 
Changes in the ranking ATP to the end of the season.

Notes

References

External links 
 
 
 

1990 births
Living people
Peruvian male tennis players
People from Arequipa
Pan American Games medalists in tennis
Pan American Games bronze medalists for Peru
Tennis players at the 2019 Pan American Games
Competitors at the 2010 South American Games
South American Games medalists in tennis
South American Games bronze medalists for Peru
Competitors at the 2006 South American Games
Medalists at the 2019 Pan American Games
20th-century Peruvian people
21st-century Peruvian people